Samuel Strong (July 17, 1762 - December 5, 1832) was an American businessman, farmer, militia officer, and politician from Vermont. He attained the rank of major general, and was most notable for his leadership of a contingent of Vermont militia soldiers during the War of 1812's Battle of Plattsburgh.

Early life
Samuel Strong was born in Salisbury, Connecticut on July 17, 1762, the son of John Strong (1738-1816) and Agnes (McCure) Strong (1740-1829). His parents moved to Addison, Vermont in 1766, and were among the town's first white settlers. Samuel Strong was raised and educated in Addison and became a farmer. In 1787, he was elected Sheriff of Addison County, and he served a two-year term.

Move to Vergennes
In 1793, Strong moved to Vergennes, where he farmed and became involved in several business ventures. Strong's enterprises included timberlands, a sawmill, and a wool carding factory, where he was among the first in New England to make use of mechanical carding machines rather than disentangling, cleaning, and intermixing fibers by hand.

In addition to his farming and business interests, Strong was active in local politics and government. He was elected to the board of aldermen soon after his move to Vergennes. He represented Vergennes in the Vermont House of Representatives in 1804 and 1805. From 1805 to 1807 and 1813 to 1815 he served as assistant judge of the Addison County Court. From 1811 to 1815 he served as mayor of Vergennes.

Military career
Strong was a longtime member of the Vermont Militia, and advanced through the ranks to earn promotion to brigadier general as commander of 1st Brigade, 3rd Division in 1797. He was promoted to major general in 1804 and appointed as commander of the 3rd Division. He served in this position until 1810, when he resigned.

In the summer of 1814, Strong received word that volunteers were needed to counter the advance of the British Army near Plattsburgh, New York. Strong immediately traveled to Burlington, Vermont, where he was unanimously chosen to take the command of the Vermonters who had volunteered. During the September Battle of Plattsburgh, Strong's militia contingent took part in the successful American defense, which caused the British to retreat to Canada. After the battle, Strong was commended by Governor Martin Chittenden and the Vermont General Assembly.

Strong was the 1816 Federalist nominee for governor, and lost to Jonas Galusha. In 1818, the New York State Legislature presented Strong a commemorative sword as a token of their appreciation for his War of 1812 service.

Later life
In 1816, Strong traveled to Georgia in search of a warmer climate that would enable him to regain his health, which had been impaired as the result of wartime service. He remained for only a few months before deciding to return to Vergennes. Strong remained active in several business ventures, including a Lake Champlain ferry from Ferrisburgh, Vermont to Essex, New York. He also constructed and managed a turnpike from Middlebury to Vergennes, and from Vergennes to Adams Ferry in Panton, Vermont. In 1827, he was one of the original incorporators of the Vergennes Bank, He was selected as the bank's first president, and served in this position until his death.

Strong died in Vergennes on December 5, 1832. He was buried at Vergennes Burying Ground in Vergennes. His home, the Gen. Samuel Strong House, still stands in Vergennes and was added to the National Register of Historic Places in 1973.

Family
In 1787, Strong married Mercy Bloomer (1763-1852) of Dorset, Vermont. They were the parents of five children who lived to adulthood.

Mary, who was the wife of Roswell D. Hopkins and daughter-in-law of Roswell Hopkins.
Clarissa, the wife of Enoch D. Woodbridge, daughter-in-law of Enoch Woodbridge, and mother of Frederick E. Woodbridge.
Susan, who never married and lived with her mother in Vergennes.
Samuel Paddock, who took over management of his father's business interests and also served as a general in the state militia.
Electa, who was the wife of William Hunter Smith.

Strong's siblings included attorney Moses Strong (1772-1842), who was the father of Wisconsin politician Moses M. Strong.

References

External links

1762 births
1832 deaths
People from Addison, Vermont
People from Vergennes, Vermont
Vermont Federalists
Mayors of places in Vermont
Members of the Vermont House of Representatives
Vermont state court judges
Vermont sheriffs
American militiamen in the War of 1812
Burials in Vermont